The T-15 (or Tokamak-15) is a Russian (previously Soviet) nuclear fusion research reactor located at the Kurchatov Institute, which is based on the (Soviet-invented) tokamak design. It was the first industrial prototype fusion reactor to use superconducting magnets to control the plasma. These enormous superconducting magnets confined the plasma the reactor produced, but failed to sustain it for more than just a few seconds. Despite not being immediately applicable, this new technological advancement proved to the USSR that they were on the right path.

The T-15 achieved creating its first thermonuclear plasma in 1988 and the reactor remained operational until 1995. The plasma created was thought to solve a number of issues engineers have struggled with in the past. This combined with the USSR's desire for cheaper energy ensured the continuing progress of the T-15 under Mikhail S. Gorbachev. It was designed to replace the country's use of gas and coal as the primary sources of energy.

It achieved  and  injection for 1 second pulse. It carried out about 100 shots before closing (in 1995) due to a lack of funds.

1996 upgrade 
From 1996 to 1998 a series of upgrades were made to the reactor, in order to conduct preliminary research for the design work on the International Thermonuclear Experimental Reactor or ITER. ITER will also use superconducting magnets. The nuclear predecessors before such as the T-10 were capable of reaching  plasma temperature. This increased temperature made it possible to introduce the electron cyclotron resonance (ECR), ion cyclotron resonance (ICR), and neutral atoms, as to maintain the reactions.

Upgrade to T-15MD 

In the year 2010 it was decided to upgrade the reactor. The upgraded machine is called T-15MD. On the basis of the T-15 there will be created a nuclear fusion–fission hybrid reactor, intended to use the neutrons generated by a core fusion reactor component to incite fission in otherwise nonfissile fuels, and to explore the feasibility of such a system for power generation. Assembly of the magnetic coils was finished in August 2019. As of early 2020 the status of construction was reported as "entering the final phase". At the end of 2020, preparations for the physical start-up of T-15MD were completed. The physical launch took place in May 2021 and further hardware upgrades are planned until 2024.

T-15MD has a major radius R =  and a minor radius a = .

References

Further reading
Josephson, P. R. (2000). Red atom: Russia's nuclear power program from Stalin to today. New York: W.H. Freeman.
Effects of the Chernobyl Nuclear Accident on Utility Share Prices. Rajiv Kalra, Glenn V. Henderson, Jr. and Gary A. Raines. Quarterly Journal of Business and Economics, Vol. 32, No. 2 (Spring, 1993), pp. 52–77.

External links
Kurchatov Institute T-15

Tokamaks
Nuclear technology in the Soviet Union
Soviet inventions